LAX/Metro Transit Center station (called the East ITF by LAX and known as Aviation/96th Street during planning) is an under-construction light rail transport hub in the Los Angeles County Metro Rail system, located near the intersection of Aviation Boulevard and 96th Street in the Westchester district of Los Angeles. The station was designed as a station for the K Line. In 2014, LAWA and the LA Metro committee approved a plan for a people mover to the LAX airport terminals, which will connect to Metro at this station.

Plans for both the new airport station and the Aviation/Century station continue. The Century railroad bridge was demolished on July 25, 2014. The LAX/Metro Transit Center station is currently under construction and slated to open in late 2024, several months after the people mover begins operation.

Service

Station layout

Connections 

Future Metro transit connections
Metro has proposed to make this station the southern terminus for phase two of the Sepulveda Pass Transit Corridor. Metro is in the route planning stage for phase one of the corridor  with completion planned for around 2040. Metro has also proposed the LAX/Metro Transit Center station as the southern terminus for the Lincoln Boulevard Transit Corridor bus rapid transit line with a completion date of 2047. Both projects are funded by Measure M.

References

Future Los Angeles Metro Rail stations
K Line (Los Angeles Metro)
C Line (Los Angeles Metro)
Los Angeles International Airport
Railway stations scheduled to open in 2024
Westchester, Los Angeles
LAX Automated People Mover stations